The 1982–83 Football League Trophy was the second edition of the tournament now renamed the Football League Trophy. It was won by Millwall, who beat Lincoln City 3–1 in the final at Sincil Bank. Next season the tournament would be replaced by the Associate Members' Cup which still runs as the EFL Trophy.

First round

Group A

Group B

Group C

Group D

Group E

Group F

Group G

Group H

Quarter-finals

Semi-finals

Final

Millwall line-up

Notes

References

Football League Group Cup
Full